Seance is a Swedish death metal band. The band was formed in March 1990 when two local Linköping bands, Orchriste and Total Death, fused. They split up after two albums in 1998. Most band members were also involved in the bands Satanic Slaughter and Witchery. Patrik Jensen later joined the band The Haunted. They reunited in early 2008 and released a 2009 album, Awakening of the Gods, through Pulverised Records.

Members

Line-up
 Johan Larsson – vocals, (1990-1998, 2008-present), bass (1995-1998, 2008-present)
 Tony Toxine Vargfrost – rhythm guitar (1990-1998, 2008-present)
 Micke (aka Mique Flesh) – drums (1990-1998, 2008-present)
 Tomas Andersson - lead guitar (2013-present)

Former members
 Bino Carlsson – bass (1990-1995)
 Patrik Jensen – lead guitar (1990-1995)
 Rille (aka Richard Corpse) – lead guitar (1995-1998, 2008-2013)

Timeline

Discography
 Levitised Spirit (Demo, 1991)
 Fornever Laid to Rest (1992)
 Saltrubbed Eyes (1993)
 Awakening of the Gods (2009)

References

External links
Seance on Myspace
Pulverised Records

Swedish death metal musical groups
Musical groups established in 1990
Musical groups disestablished in 1998
Black Mark Production artists